Malaysia national under-23 football team, also known as Malaysia Under-23, Malaysia U-23 or Malaysia Olympic football team is the national association football team of Malaysia in under-23 and 22 level, representing the country at the Olympic Games, Asian Games and Southeast Asian Games, as well as any other under-23 international football tournaments including the AFC U-23 Championship.

It is controlled by the Football Association of Malaysia (FAM). The team won the 2009 and 2011 SEA Games gold medal.

History
The team is considered to be the feeder team for the Malaysia national football team. It is for players aged 23 and less, however 3 senior players can also be selected to play. Also in existence are national teams for the Under-20s, Under-17s and Under-15s. As long as they are eligible, players can play at any level, hence it is possible for one to play for the U-23s, senior side and then again for the U-23s.

Olympic 2000
After the 1997 FIFA World Youth Championship, FAM was aiming to qualify for the 2000 Sydney Olympic. Thus, the FAM spent about US$6 million and continued the contract of Malaysian youth team coach, Hatem Souissi. Then FAM formed a squad known as Olympic 2000 with a combination of 1997 youth squad and other under 23 players. FAM decided to include Olympic 2000 as one of the teams in Malaysia League. Their first match was against Johor FA in a qualification match for Malaysia Premier I League. The team won their first match away 1–0 before drawing 1–1 at home to qualify for Malaysia Premier I League. However the team finished bottom during the 1998 season with only 4 wins in 22 matches. The Olympic 2000 also showed poor performance at the international stage. They were humiliated by the Thailand Asian Games squad in a 1998 friendly match as the Thais beat them 9–0. During the qualification matches, Olympic 2000 only managed to finish third behind Hong Kong and Japan. It was questioned among fans how a squad that had been playing together since 1995 with fine talents and given so much exposure cannot achieve expectations.

Disbandment of Harimau Muda
After Harimau Muda project disbanded, FAM needed a fresh start for the U-23 team where a new set of players was brought in for the team with the creation of SEA Games Project 2017 team. The players in the team mainly consisted of players with ages around 18 to 21 years old where the oldest players will be below the age requirement of 22 years old when 2017 SEA Games in Malaysia started. With a bigger pool of players within age of 18–22, the players in the team will also play in other age-restricted tournament as the younger side such as U-21 and U-22 when needed.

Revival of the team

Southeast Asian Games

2009 Southeast Asian Games

In July 2009, K. Rajagopal was named as the new coach of the Malaysia U-23 team. Under his management, Malaysia qualified for the semifinals of the 2009 SEA Games after becoming the runners-up of Group A with only one point behind the group champion, Vietnam. Malaysia then defeated Laos 3–1 in the semifinals, before meeting Vietnam again and defeating them 1–0 in the final with an own goal scored by Mai Xuân Hợp in 85th minute. This was to be their fifth SEA Games gold medal and also the first great achievement for the U-23 team under Rajagopal who also led Malaysia to qualify for the second round of the 2010 Asian Games as one of the four best third-placed teams after a lapse of 32 years.

2011 Southeast Asian Games

In 2011, the team was taken over by Ong Kim Swee. The new coach later arranged two friendly matches against Thailand and Singapore in preparation for the 2012 Olympics qualifiers. Malaysia lost narrowly by 1–2 to Thailand but won 2–0 against Singapore.

Malaysia then advanced to the semifinals of the 2011 SEA Games by topping Group A after defeating the host, Indonesia 1–0. Then, Malaysia also beat Myanmar 1–0 in the semifinals to advance to the final. In the final, they met Indonesia again and held them to a 1–1 draw until the end, resulting in a penalty shoot-out which Malaysia won 4–3. This was also the sixth SEA Games football gold medal led by Ong Kim Swee after the successful achievement in 2009.

Summer Olympics Qualification

2012 Summer Olympics Qualification

The team then continued their success by qualifying for the third round of 2012 Olympic Asian Qualifiers after defeating Pakistan in the first round and Lebanon in the second round where they became the sole team from Southeast Asia to qualify for the third round. However, in the third round, Malaysia lost all of their first three third round matches at the 2012 Olympic Asian qualifying matches, losing 0–2 to both Japan and Syria and 2–3 to Bahrain. Malaysia also lost their second three third round matches and was subsequently eliminated.

AFC U-23 Championship

2018 AFC U-23 Championship

Several years after the revival, the team made another debut to pass the AFC U-23 qualification in 2018. Positioned in Group H, the team managed to defeat Indonesia by a score of 3–0 while suffering a similar score defeat to Thailand in the second match, the team subsequently bounced back and defeated Mongolia by 2–0. By leading the group, Malaysia was able to qualify for the AFC U-23 Championship. The team was then placed in Group C, losing to Iraq in the first match by 1–4 before bouncing back to hold Jordan 1–1 and defeating Saudi Arabia 1–0, to end up as the group runner-up and subsequently became the first Southeast Asian representatives alongside Vietnam to qualify for the quarterfinal of the tournament for the first time in both teams' history. In their quarterfinal match however, Malaysia lost to South Korea by 1–2.

Asian Games

2018 Asian Games

The team then achieved surprising results after being drawn in Group E in the 2018 Asian Games together with Kyrgyzstan, defending champion South Korea and Bahrain. Malaysia opened their group matches with a 3–1 victory against Kyrgyzstan before defeating the tournament favourites South Korea that was led by their 2018 FIFA World Cup players such as the famous pair of strikers Son Heung-min, Hwang Hee-chan and their goalkeeper Jo Hyeon-woo by 2–1, but the goalkeeper did not play in the match since he was rested. Malaysia's victory against South Korea is their first win against the South Korea in the Asian Games tournament after 16 years. With expectations running high from the fans and rising, the team however failed to continue their success after losing to Bahrain by 2–3 after already having qualified for the second round and leading the group. The team then met Japan and was eliminated from the tournament after their players wasted attacking opportunities by playing cautiously in addition to their defensive mistakes in the 90th minute that subsequently gave the advantage to their opponents with a penalty kick being awarded which was successfully converted by Japanese striker Ayase Ueda resulting in a 0–1 score until the end of the match.

International scene

In 2009, the Malaysian team started using the same squad for their under-23 team and senior team under the new management of coach K. Rajagopal. The senior team uses players below the age of 23, together with their senior players like Safee Sali and Norhafiz Zamani Misbah. This was set for the national team to prepare for the challenges ahead of them. Since then, Malaysia also used some of their under-23 players for other tournaments such as the Ho Chi Minh City Cup, 2010 Asian Games and 2010 AFF Championship. Malaysia followed this practice since the Football Association of Malaysia chairman, HRH Sultan Ahmad Shah, planned this and set it mainly for Rajagopal. This is as a result of the humiliating loss of the senior team by 0–5 to the United Arab Emirates at the 2011 AFC Asian Cup qualification.

Tournament records

Olympic Games

Note
 Since 1992, football at the Summer Olympics changes into Under-23 tournament.

Asian Games

Note
 Since 2002, football at the Asian Games changes into Under-23 tournament.
 * : Denotes draws including knockout matches decided on penalty kicks.

AFC U-23 Championship

Note
 U-22 in 2012, U-23 since 2015 qualification.

SEA Games

Note
 1 : The under-22 national team played at the 2017 edition.
 * : Denotes draws including knockout matches decided on penalty kicks.
 ** : Red border colour indicates tournament was held on home soil.

*Win on penalty kicks.
**Loss on penalty kicks.

ASEAN U-23

Note
 * : Denotes draws including knockout matches decided on penalty kicks.

Summer Universiade

Note
 In the 2013 edition, Malaysia sent the U-23 team.
 * : Denotes draws including knockout matches decided on penalty kicks.

Recent results and fixtures

2021

2022

2023

Coaching Staff

Source:

Squad

Current squad
 The following players were called up for the 2023 Merlion Cup.
 Match dates: 24-26 March 2023
 Caps and goals correct as of: 22 May 2022, after the match against 

Coaches

  Chow Kwai Lam (1990–1991)
  Richard Bate (1992–1994)
  Claude Le Roy (1994–1995)
  Hatem Souissi (1997–1999)
  Allan Harris (2000–2004)
  Bertalan Bicskei (2005)
  Norizan Bakar (2005–2007)
  B. Sathianathan (2007–2009)
  K. Rajagopal (2009–2010)
  Ong Kim Swee (2010–2015; 2017–2019)
  Frank Bernhardt (2016–2017)
  Brad Maloney (2021—2022)
  E. Elavarasan (2022 - present)

Honours

Regional
 Southeast Asian Games  Gold medals (2): 2009 and 2011
  Silver medal (2): 2001 and 2017
  Bronze medals (2): 2003 and 2005

Others
 Bangabandhu Cup  Winner (2): 1996/97, 2015
 Pestabola Merdeka  Winners (2): 2007, 2013
 SCTV Cup  Winner (1)''': 2012

See also
 Malaysia national football team
 Malaysia women's national football team
 Malaysia national under-22 football team
 Malaysia national under-19 football team
 Malaysia national under-16 football team

References

External links
 Harimau Malaysia (National Olympic Team/U22 Team)
 FIFA profile: Malaysia / Fixtures & Results

Asian national under-23 association football teams
U-23